Adam Byström Johansson (born March 2, 1996) is a Swedish ice hockey player. He is currently playing with Växjö Lakers of the Swedish Hockey League (SHL).

Johansson made his Swedish Hockey League debut playing with Växjö Lakers during the 2013–14 SHL season.

References

External links

1996 births
Living people
People from Munkfors Municipality
Swedish ice hockey right wingers
Växjö Lakers players
Sportspeople from Värmland County